Jugraj Singh (born 11 December 1996) is an Indian field hockey player who plays as a defender for the Indian national team.

References

External links

Jugraj Singh at Hockey India

1996 births
Living people
Field hockey players from Punjab, India
Indian male field hockey players
Male field hockey defenders
Field hockey players at the 2022 Commonwealth Games
Commonwealth Games silver medallists for India
Commonwealth Games medallists in field hockey
Medallists at the 2022 Commonwealth Games